Álvaro Guillén Meza (born 2 January 2003) is an Ecuadorian tennis player.

Guillén Meza has a career high ATP singles ranking of 722 achieved on 21 November 2022. He also has a career high ATP doubles ranking of 636 achieved on 8 August 2022.

Guillén Meza represents Ecuador at the Davis Cup, where he has a W/L record of 0–1.

Tour finals

Doubles

References

External links

2003 births
Living people
Ecuadorian male tennis players
Sportspeople from Guayaquil